The aspect ratio of a geometric shape is the ratio of its sizes in different dimensions.

Aspect ratio may also refer to:

 Aspect ratio (aeronautics), the ratio of a wing's span to its mean chord
 Aspect ratio (image), the proportional relationship between an image's width and its height
 Display aspect ratio, the proportional relationship between a computer monitor's width and its height
 Pixel aspect ratio, a mathematical ratio that describes how the width of a pixel in a digital image compares to the height of that pixel
 Automotive engine aspect ratio, controlled by variable-geometry turbochargers